Pedro Fernández de Híjar (1245/49-1299) was the first Baron of Híjar, and knight of Order of the Holy Sepulchre. He was the illegitimate son of King James I of Aragon, and Berenguela Fernández (m. 1272).

He took part in the crusade of 1269.

References

Bibliography

 
 
 

1245 births
1299 deaths
Pedro
Medieval Knights of the Holy Sepulchre
Sons of kings